The 1973 Campeonato Argentino de Rugby  was won by the selection of Buenos Aires that beat in the final the selection of Unión de Rugby de Rosario

That year in Argentina rugby union

National 
 Nel 1973 was played the first Argentine championship for club, precursor of the Nacional de Clubes, that will start definitely in 1993. This tournament was won by Marista Rugby Club of Mendoza.
 The selection of Buenos Aires won also the second edition of "Campeonato Juvenil" (under-19).
 The Buenos Aires Champsionship was won by San Isidro Club
 The Cordoba Province Championship was won by Córdoba Athletic
 The North-East Championship was won by Uni Tucuman and Lawn Tennis
 The rugby suffered the turmoils of the Argentine political situation: in the days of the return in Argentina of Peron: in March there were a discussion between the U.A.R and the government that in 1971 didn't allow to the "Pumas" to visit Rhodesia, cause the racial politics of that country, and then contested to UAR the permit gave to San Isidro Club to visit the same country. The federal committee of UAR resigned and a new election was held on 24 April 1973. In November the government also forbid all the visit to South Africa to any Argentine team.

International 
 On 13 July the Rugby Union cancelled the tour of English team, originally scheduled for August–September. The decision was made after the Ezeiza massacre, cause the flair of terror attacks.

The UAR contested the decision and the RFU offered to play a match in Twickenham on 1 December, at the end of the Argentina's tour of Scotland and Ireland, but the UAR refuse this proposal considering the decision "unilateral, hasty, and based on wrong information about the situation of Argentine Republic … "-

The tour were replaced with by a tour of Romania. The UAR, as retaliation, forbid to any Club o Provincial selection to visit England

 At the end of the year, Argentina visit for the first time Europe with a tour in Scotland and Ireland.

Knock out stages 

,

Semifinals 
 '''Sistema di punteggio:  meta = 4 punti, Trasformazione=2 punti .Punizione and calcio da mark=  3 punti. drop = 3 punti. 

Buenos Aires :Dudley Morgan,  Alejandro Altberg,  Arturo Rodríguez Jurado,  Roberto Matarazzo,  Eduardo Morgan,   Hugo Porta,  Luis Gradín,  Jorge Carracedo,  Hugo Miguens,  Miguel Iglesias,  José Virasoro,  José Fernández,  Mario Carluccio,  Juan Dumas,  Fernando Insúa. 
Rosario: Angel Rodríguez,  Carlos García,  Ricardo Muzzio,  César Blanco,  Andrés Knight,  Javier Escalante,  Ricardo Castagna,  Eduardo Mainini,  Ricardo Covella,  Víctor Macat,  Osvaldo Galesio,  Juan Mangiamelli,  Alejandro Risler,  José Costanté,  Miguel Senatore.

 Cordoba: E. Mezquida,  C. Pispiero,  J. Martínez,  N. Trebuq,  D. Clavería,  M. Bernis Sales,  C. Bergallo,  R. Byleveld,  L. Domínguez,  C. Cotonaro,  R. Campra,  R. Passaglia,  J. Ruggero,  H. Bianchi,  A. Cossini.
Cuyo:' J. Castro,  C. Dorá,  O. Terranova,  D. Muñiz,  M. Brandi,  C. Navesi,  L. Chacón,  J. Navesi,  J. Nasazzi,  R. Ituarte,  R. Cattáneo,  E. Sánchez,  R. Fariello,  L. M. Ramos,  J. Cribelli.

Final

 Buenos Aires :Dudley Morgan,  Roberto Matarazzo,  Alejandro Travaglini,  Arturo Rodríguez jurado,  Eduardo Morgan,  Hugo Porta,  Luis Gradín,  Miguel Iglesias,  Hugo Miguens,  Jorge Carracedo,  José Virasoro,  José Fernández,  Mario Carluccio,  Juan Dumas,  Fernando Insúa. 
  Cuyo : Ernesto Naveyra,  Julio Villanueva,  Ricardo Tarquini,  Daniel Muñiz,  Miguel Brandi,  Carlos Navesi,  Luis Chacón,  Luis Crivelli,  Luis Ramos,  Roberto Fariello,  Eduardo Sánchez,  Alfredo Cattáneo,  Jorge Navesi,  Jorge Nasazzi,  Raúl Ituarte.

Notes

Bibliography 
  Memorias de la UAR 1973
  XXIX Campeonato Argentino 

Campeonato Argentino de Rugby
Argentina